This is a list containing the Billboard Hot Latin Tracks number-ones of 2002.

See also
Billboard Hot Latin Tracks

References

2002 record charts
Lists of Billboard Hot Latin Songs number-one songs
2002 in Latin music